The Western Indiana Conference is the name of two IHSAA-sanctioned conferences based in West Central Indiana. The first formed as an eight-team league that formed as a basketball league in 1944 as the West Central Conference. The league started expanding in 1945 and changed its name to the Western Indiana Conference. With consolidation forcing many membership changes in the 1970s (including all the Terre Haute public schools), the conference folded at four members in  1983.

The second incarnation started in 1999, including four previous members (or their current incarnations) from the old conference, and three other schools from South Central Indiana. Its only change in membership in its first 16 years was in football, where South Vermilion played independently for the 2007 and 2008 seasons before rejoining the conference. March 2014 marked a sea change for the conference, as what originally was an invite for Greencastle turned into inviting the remaining five teams of the West Central Conference to join. All seven WIC schools and all five WCC schools voted to expand the conference into 2015, making a 12 team, two division league. All 12 schools are within 30 miles of Interstate 70 or Interstate 69

After the 2018–2019 school year, Cascade departed from the Western Indiana Conference to join longtime rival and former West Central Conference member Monrovia in the Indiana Crossroads Conference. Cascade will fill a vacancy that Park Tudor is leaving. The move leaves the Western Indiana Conference will 11 schools, dissolving the east–west divisions for team sports, except football

Members

Former Members

Team Sports Divisions (2015-2019) 

With Cascade's departure from the Conference, the current Cross-Over system will be eliminated and all conference schools will play each other in the regular season of boys’ and girls’ basketball, baseball, softball, football, volleyball, boys’ and girls’ soccer, and boys’ and girls’ tennis. Boys’ and girls’ swimming and diving, track and field, cross country, wrestling, and golf will still hold one-day conference tournaments.

Football Divisions (2019-)

Old Conference Membership

 Linton-Stockton played concurrently in the WIC and the SIAC from 1944 to 1951.
 State played concurrently in the WIC and the Tri-River Conference from 1964 to 1978.
 South Vermillion was known as Clinton until 1977. The smaller schools in southern Vermillion County had consolidated into Clinton by 1963, but the school did not change its name right away (and kept Clinton's school colors and nickname), so this is considered a name change rather than an actual consolidation of schools.
 Sullivan played concurrently in the WIC and the SIAC from 1944 to 1962.
 Schulte played concurrently in the WIC and the Tri-River from 1964 to 1977.

Football Champions
This list includes champions for both the old and new versions of the conference. Spit championships are denoted by an asterisk, East and West Division champions are annotated by an E and W, respectively, while the conference championship game winner is denoted by a C. With the green and gold divisions, Gold Division Champion is denoted by GO and the Green Division Champion is denoted by GR. 

 Conference began football competition in 1946, and did not compete from 1982 to 1999. Champions for 1956 and 1958-9 are unknown.

Conference Championship Games
2015 Northview 28, Owen Valley 14
2016 Sullivan 63, Indian Creek 42
2017 Sullivan 48, Indian Creek 38
2018 Northview 32, Indian Creek 22
2019 Indian Creek 32, Northview 28

References

http://www.bannergraphic.com/story/2071979.html

Resources 
 IHSAA Conferences
 IHSAA Directory

Indiana high school athletic conferences
High school sports conferences and leagues in the United States